To the Virgins, to Make Much of Time

— First lines from Robert Herrick's To the Virgins, to Make Much of Time, first published this year

Nationality words link to articles with information on the nation's poetry or literature (for instance, Irish or France).

Events

Works published

Great Britain
 Joseph Beaumont, Psyche; or, Loves Mysterie, In XX Canto's
 Richard Corbet, Poetica Stromata; or, A Collection of Sundry Peices [sic] in Poetry, the second edition of Certain Elegant Poems 1647, (see also Poems 1672)
 William Davenant, London, King Charles his Augusta, or, City Royal, of the founders, the names, and oldest honours of that City
 Sir Richard Fanshawe, Il Pastor Fido the Faithfull Shepherd, entirely written by Fanshawe; intended as an addition to his translation of Giovanni Battista Guarini's Il Pastor Fido 1647
 Robert Herrick, Hesperides; or, The Works both Humane and Divine of Robert Herrick Esq., in two parts, secular and religious, the later with its own title page, with the title His Noble Numbers; or, His Pious Pieces; includes "To the Virgins, to Make Much of Time"; the book states it was published in 1647, but it was published this year
 George Wither, writing under the pen name "Terrae-Filius", Prosopopoeia Britannica

Other
 Alaol, Padmavati, Bangladesh
 Francisco de Quevedo, El Parnasso español, monte en dos cumbres, dividido con las nueve Musas castellanas ("The Spanish Parnassus, Mount with two peaks, shared by the nine Castilian Muses,"), edited by Antonio Jose Gonzalez de Salas; Spain
 Paul Scarron, Virgile travesti; France

Births
Death years link to the corresponding "[year] in poetry" article:
 February 1 – Elkanah Settle (died 1724), English poet and playwright
 April 7 – John Sheffield, 1st Duke of Buckingham and Normanby (died 1721), English statesman and poet
 November 12 – Juana Inés de la Cruz (died 1695), Mexican Hieronymite nun, polymath, poet and playwright
Also:
 Gaspard Abeille (died 1718), French lyric and tragic poet
 Petter Dass (died 1707), Norwegian poet

Deaths
Birth years link to the corresponding "[year] in poetry" article:
 January 14 – Barlaeus, also known as Kaspar van Baerle (born 1584), Dutch
 May 26 – Vincent Voiture (born 1597), French poet and writer
 August 20 – Edward Herbert (born 1583), Anglo-Welsh soldier, diplomat, historian, poet and religious philosopher
 Thomas Ford (born 1580), English composer, lutenist, viol player and poet
 Judah Leone Modena, also known as: Leon Modena or Yehudah Aryeh Mi-modena, (born 1571), a rabbi, orator, scholar, teacher and Hebrew-language poet
 Syed Sultan (born 1550), Bengali poet
 Tirso de Molina (born 1571), Spanish Baroque dramatist and poet
 William Percy (born 1574), English poet

See also

 Poetry
 17th century in poetry
 17th century in literature
 Cavalier poets in England, who supported the monarch against the puritans in the English Civil War

Notes

17th-century poetry
Poetry